The 10th Parachute Brigade (Jawi: ١٠ بريڬيد ڤارا), commonly known as 10 Para, is an elite brigade-sized airborne unit within the Malaysian Army tasked with being rapidly deployed inside or outside the boundaries of Malaysia. 10 Para is the key element of the Rapid Deployment Force.

10 Para is the only elite unit in the Malaysian Armed Forces to open its membership to women. The other elite unit to open its membership to women is the Unit Tindakhas (UTK; 'Special Actions Unit') of the Royal Malaysia Police.

History

10 Para's primary role is to be the nation's main offensive force in time of war or emergencies. The creation of the Parachute Brigade was proposed by Malaysia's defence planners in the late 1970s as a part of the modernisation plan for the military. The plan originally did not receive much support from the government due to concerns that the formation of such a brigade would be looked with suspicion by its neighbour, Singapore.

In November 1988, Malaysia was unable to respond to a request for assistance by Maldives when that country was invaded by Tamil mercenaries. This inability to render timely help to prompt Malaysian leaders to move to form paratrooper units within the Malaysian Army.

Timeline
 1988 – A single Malaysian Army infantry battalion from the 8th Royal Ranger Regiment is parachute trained and converted from their traditional infantry role into a parachute battalion. This battalion becomes the first members of the new rapid deployment force.
 1990 – The 17th Royal Malay Regiment and 9th Royal Malay Regiment are jump qualified and join the rapid deployment force.
 10 October 1994 – Malaysian Prime Minister Datuk Seri Mahathir Mohamad formally redesignates the 10 Malaysian Infantry Brigade as the 10 Parachute Brigade and in the same time given its Rapid Deployment Force status.
 October 1994 – 10 Para undertakes a rapid deployment exercise, supported by elements of the Malaysian 21 Gerup Gerak Khas ('21st Special Service Group') and PASKAL and with operational support provided by the Royal Malaysian Navy and Royal Malaysian Air Force. The Halilintar Exercise 1994 centres on a scenario of the retaking of Langkawi International Airport from an invading force by the Rapid Deployment Force spearheaded by 8th Rangers (Para).
21 February 2018 – The 18th Royal Malay Regiment was upgraded into an airborne battalion. Based at Seberang Takir Camp, Kuala Nerus, Terengganu, the 18 RAMD (Para) is entrusted to cover the east peninsular region.

Roles
10 Parachute Brigade is highly skilled in accordance with its status as a Rapid Deployment Force. The paratroopers are vigorously trained for specialised combat operations and rapid deployment in alignment with the brigade's motto  (English: Act Fast). The 10 Para can be deployed from land, air and sea.

Identities

Maroon beret
The maroon beret worn by the 10 Parachute Brigade is known as 'Pegasus'. The conditions for wearing the maroon beret are to pass the basic parachute course and to APAC course. This is an imitation of the British Parachute Regiment, as is the way the beret is worn and the cap badge. Much of their training is based on the British paras due to their reputation of being the best airborne force in the world.

Cap badge
Parachute wings with Kris on a black triangle backing pointing downwards.

Parachutist badge
For 10 Para members, the parachute wings are titled Sayap Berdarah meaning 'The Bleeding Wings'. During graduation ceremony, VIPs (usually the Chief of Army or the Commander of 10 Para) or instructors will punch the metal parachute wing into graduates' chest. The sharp pins from the wing will make graduates bleed with their wings.

PAC shoulder tab
This tab is only worn by the members of 10 Para on their left shoulder both at service dress uniform and battledress. The tab is in maroon colour and embroidered with black letters 'PAC' which an acronym for Pasukan Aturgerak Cepat.

Airborne shoulder tab
This tab is worn by any soldiers who passed the Basic Parachute Course held by the PULPAK. The tab is similar to the US Army 101st Airborne Division tab; yellow/gold 'AIRBORNE' letters embroidered on black background, and worn on the right shoulder of the service dress uniform. The black and olive version is worn at the combat uniform.

Slogan
Tiada Misi Terlalu Sukar, Tiada Pengorbanan Terlalu Besar, Tugas Diutamakan ('No Mission Is Too Difficult, No Sacrifice Is Too Great, Duty Becomes Priority')

Brigade composition

10 Parachute Brigade is based at Terendak Camp, Malacca, also known as 'Home of the Paras'.

Current formation
The brigade consists of:
 Four parachute infantry battalions
 8th Battalion Royal Ranger Regiment (Para) 
 9th Battalion Royal Malay Regiment (Para)
 17th Battalion Royal Malay Regiment (Para)
 18th Battalion Royal Malay Regiment (Para) – Based at Seberang Takir Camp. Declared as a full airborne battalion on 21 February 2018.
 Royal Artillery Regiment
 1st Royal Artillery Regiment (Para)
 Royal Armoured Corps
 Armoured Squadron (Para) – Based at Sungai Buluh Camp. Equipped with Alvis Scorpion 90 armed with 90 mm Cockerill Mk III gun and Stormer APC armed with 20 mm Oerlikon Contraves gun.
 Support units
 10th Squadron Royal Signals Regiment (Para)
 361st Battery Air Defence Royal Artillery Regiment (Para)
 10th Squadron Royal Engineer Regiment (Para)
 10th Field Workshop Company (Para)
Pathfinder Company (Para)
 Support Company (Para)
 Royal Military Police Corps Platoon (Para)
Royal Medical Corps Company (Para)

Training
Members of the brigade must pass a Kursus Asas Payung Terjun ('Basic Parachute Course') and Kursus Asas Pasukan Aturgerak Cepat (APAC; 'Basic Rapid Deployment Force Course') before being qualified to wear the maroon beret and parachute wing.

Preparatory Course (2 Weeks) 
This warm-up session lasts for two weeks. The candidates are prepared physically and mentally for the actual course. Candidates need to run 2.5 km (1.6 mi) twice a day at 0700 hrs and 1500 hrs.

Basic Parachute Course (4 Weeks) 
This course is conducted at PULPAK, Sungai Udang Camp, Malacca. This course is compulsory for a non-combat soldier (doctors, nurses, chefs, religions officers, intelligence, etc.) to be attached to the 10 Para.

This course is divided into three phases:

Phase 1: Theory

The first phase lasts for two weeks. Candidates are taught the correct techniques, how to land, emergency procedures if the main chute did not deploy or did not open correctly, emergency procedures if a collision happens in the air, how to deploy the second chute, discipline in the aircraft, landing techniques in difficult conditions (rough wind, water etc.) and the correct technique to pack the parachute after landing.

Every Friday, candidates need to pass these physical tests:

 Running  under 16 minutes
 Rope climbing 
 Chin-up 6 reps
 Press-up 32 reps under 1 minute
 Sit-up 32 reps under 1 minute
 Buddy-carry

Phase 2: Tower week

Lasts for one week, the theories learnt in phase 1 is tested at high tower. Each candidate needs to carry  of equipment for each exercise. The exercises are:

 45 minutes sit in hot mock airplane in full battle equipment
 Jumping from  tower
 Exit tower  exercise

Phase 3: Jump week

This is the final phase of the Basic Parachute Course. Non-PAC candidates are given their parachute wings right after performing the last jump while the PAC candidates move to the next course. In jump week, candidates are sent to a selected airport. The airport and drop zones are not fixed. Some of the known drop zones are Gong Kedak, Kelantan, Padang Terap, Kedah and Pontian, Johor.

Compulsory jump is eight jumps with at least two jumps in full battle equipment. However, there are a few cases in which only seven jumps are needed if the weather conditions did not permit.

Basic Rapid Deployment Course (5 Weeks) 

Known as Kursus Asas Pasukan Aturgerak Cepat (APAC) in Malay language, this rigorous course is conducted at Perkampungan Gempita Para ('Para Combat Village'), Terendak Camp, Malacca. The purpose of this course is to mentally and physically train the paratroopers to its elite status, applying esprit de corps and emphasise the 'Buddy System' among themselves. Also known as Latihan Semangat Waja, this course is divided into two phases.

Phase 1: Camp phase

Trainees need to learn theory and also endure physical training.

The theories they need to learn are:

 Air traffic operations
 Amphibious operations
 Air assault operations

Physical training/test they need to endure:

 Obstacle crossing
 Speed march test
 Swimming test
 Abseiling and repelling test
 Basic combat swimmer
 Determination training

Phase 2: Field phase

In this phase, trainees are trained with basic 10 Para tasks and they will be tested to perform the task under stress. Among the training is:

 Climb and descend Mount Ledang in Johor
 Speed march 
 Loaded march 
 Night and day navigation 
 Survival skills (Swamp area)
 River crossing
 Paddling combat craft 

The final training is conducted at Parawood, Terendak Camp. Trainees need to swim  in murky water with weapon and equipment before been bestowed with the maroon beret and the bleeding wing. The ceremony ends with the para oath and para dance by the graduates.

Advanced training 

The career with the 10 Para does not stop once they receive the maroon beret. The 10 Para members can proceed to the next level of training by participating in an advanced course offered to them by the Malaysian Armed Forces. They can also try to join the 10 Para's Special Forces Equivalent Unit, the Pandura Company ('Pathfinder'). Some of the veteran paratroopers of the 10 Para proceeded to enter the Basic Commando Course.

Some of the Advanced/Specialist training includes:

 Tactical Air Landing Operations (TALO)
 Free Fall
Close Quarters Combat (CQC)
HALO/HAHO
Sniper
Demolition expert
Marksmanship
Sharpshooters
Pathfinder
Combat medic (Airborne)

Equipment

Para oath 

Kami berikrar bahawa kami, sentiasa mentaati Rukun Negara dan Ikrar Kesatria.
Kami berikrar bahawa kami, dengan kemahuan kami sendiri, diterjunkan dan melaksanakan tugas parajurit para.
Kami berikrar bahawa kami menjunjung tinggi dan mempertahankan darjat, nama, kehormatan dan jiwa parajurit para.
Kami berikrar bahawa kami, sentiasa bersiap sedia untuk diterjunkan pada setiap saat, di mana jua, dan dalam keadaan apa sekalipun.
Kami berikrar bahawa kami, sentiasa bersikap sopan dan menurut perintah dengan ikhlas dan jujur.

"We pledge that we, always obey the Rukun Negara and the Warriors' Pledge.
We pledge that we, with our own will, jump (sic) and carry out the duties of the paratroopers.
We pledge that we uphold and defend the ranks, names, honours and souls of the paratroopers.
We pledge that we are always ready to jump (sic) at any time, anywhere, and in whatever circumstances.
We pledge that we will always be polite and sincerely and honestly carry all orders given to us."

Recent operations
The unit has been deployed in the following operations:

Malaysian Medical Team, Pakistan
On 14 October 2005, The Malaysian Medical Team (MasMedTim) soldiers serving in earthquake-hit Battagram, Pakistan have been recommended for a service allowance of RM100 a day. The team, which left for Pakistan had set up a field hospital in Battagram, some 250 km from Islamabad, on 26 October. Equipped only with tents that were more suitable for the tropics and kerosene heaters, MasMedTim soldiers had to battle subzero temperatures while carrying out their duties of providing aid to survivors of 8 October South Asia earthquake. Insufficient winter clothes and the lack of hot water at the campsite was affecting soldiers for over two months now as the temperature sometimes dropped to minus 7 degrees Celsius (−7 °C) at night.

Operations "Padanan, Sipadan Island Resort"
The security surveillance, code-named Operation Padanan Sipadan Island Resort or known as Ops Pasir, which was launched on 20 September 2000 following the hostage-taking incidents in Sipadan and Pandanan islands, had restored confidence among tourists, including from the United States, to come to the resort islands. The integrated operation involves the Malaysian army, navy and air force as well as other related agencies such as the police and the coast guard.

Honorary maroon beret 
As the second most prestige beret in the Malaysian Army; only after the green beret of the Grup Gerak Khas, the maroon beret of 10 Para is honorarily awarded to the high ranking individuals, military or government high ranking and foreign VIPs. In Malaysia, the honorary beret is part of the official military attires.

Among the recipients is:

 King Hamad bin Isa Al Khalifa, King of Bahrain, received in May 2017.
 Sultan Nazrin Shah, Sultan of Perak, received in August 2014.
 Sultan Sallehuddin, Sultan of Kedah, received in February 2018.
 Crown Prince Al-Muhtadee Billah, Crown Prince of Brunei, received in November 2013.
 Crown Prince Tengku Amir Shah. Crown Prince of Selangor, received in March 2017. Tengku Amir is a graduate of APAC Series 2/2016. He held the rank Leftenan Muda (Second Lieutenant) in 17 RAMD (Para) when he received the beret.
 Dato' Seri Najib Razak, former Prime Minister of Malaysia, received in October 2003.
 Datuk Seri Hishammuddin Hussein, former Malaysian Minister of Defence, received in July 2013.
General Tan Sri Ismail Omar, former Malaysian Chief of Defence Force, 1st recipient.
 General Suraphong Suwana-adth, Thailand Chief of Defence Forces, received in May 2017.
 Major General Pengiran Dato Seri Aminan Pengiran Haji Mahmud, Royal Brunei Armed Forces Commander, received in March 2014.
General Datuk Ismail Hassan, former Malaysian Chief of Army, 2nd recipient.
General Datuk Mohd. Zahidi Zainuddin, former Malaysian Chief of Army, 3rd recipient.
 General Udomdej Sitabutr, Commander-in-Chief of the Royal Thai Army, received in March 2015.
 General Chalermchai Sitthisad, Commander-in-Chief of the Royal Thai Army, received in April 2017.
 General Budiman, Chief-of-Staff of the Indonesian National Armed Forces, received in October 2013.
Lieutenant General George Toisutta, Chief-of-Staff of the Indonesian Army, received on 11 May 2010.

Killed in the line of duty 

Pvt. Awanis Othman, who died during a parachute exercise in Melaka on 31 July 1998.
Pvt. Siti Hajar Yakob with three other paratroopers died during the full opening parachute rehearsal for the Langkawi International Maritime and Aerospace Exhibition (LIMA) on 2 December 2007.

In popular culture 
Books, televisions and movie featuring the 10th Parachute Brigade

2010: "Delta Two Bar", a telemovie by RTM about a son of a Malaysian Communist Insurgency War veteran serves with the 10 Para.
2016: "Majalah 3: Wira Semerah Hati", a documentary by TV3 about 10 Para's operations.
2017: "Panorama: Sayap Berdarah", a documentary by RTM about 10 Para's operations. Aired on 15 September 2017.
2019: "", a TV series by TV3 starring Janna Nick and  about the youngest daughter of a retired army officer dreaming to succeed her father legacy even though been prevented by her family. She ultimately becomes an officer and a paratrooper in the elite 10 Para. Aired on 7 February 2019.

See also

Elite Forces of Malaysia
Malaysian Army 21st Grup Gerak Khas
 Royal Malaysian Navy PASKAL
 Royal Malaysian Air Force PASKAU
 Malaysia Coast Guard Special Task and Rescue
 Royal Malaysia Police Pasukan Gerakan Khas

References

Airborne infantry brigades
Formations of the Malaysian Army
Military units and formations established in the 1970s